In numerical mathematics, a non-compact stencil is a type of discretization method, where any node surrounding the node of interest may be used in the calculation. Its computational time grows with an increase of layers of nodes used. Non-compact stencils may be compared to Compact stencils.

See also
Five-point stencil

References 

Numerical differential equations